Ulavapalli is a village in Chejerla mandal, Sri Potti Sri Ramulu Nellore district, Andhra Pradesh, India.

References

Villages in Nellore district